Jan de Boer may refer to:

 Jan de Boer (gymnast) (1859–1941), Dutch gymnast
 Jan de Boer (footballer, born 1898) (1898–1988), Dutch footballer
 Jan de Boer (footballer, born 2000), Dutch footballer
 Jan de Boer (physicist), Dutch physicist